The following is a list of United States ambassadors to Nigeria.

Ambassadors

Notes

See also
Nigeria – United States relations
Foreign relations of Nigeria
Ambassadors of the United States

References
United States Department of State: Background notes on Nigeria

External links
 United States Department of State: Chiefs of Mission for Nigeria
 United States Department of State: Nigeria
 United States Embassy in Abuja

Nigeria
 
United States